Taraxias (born Georgios Gkogkas-Γεωργιος Γκογκας)is a Greek hip-hop artist.

New Clear Sonics 
Taraxias' first group was the New Clear Sonics.  After the group broke up around 1997, Taraxias recruited Isvoleas Gelos and DJ Jimmy Dee to form A.G.

Mainstream Exposure Agnostoi Gnostoi 
The group was later renamed Alpha Gamma from the Greek origins of the word "alpha"-A- and gamma-Γ-).  The group had a hardcore style of rapping.  Alpha Gamma released Neoellina Akou EP in 2000. Alpha Gamma released Agnostophobia the next year.  The video for Arketa Gia Na Mathenis was banned from television.  Because of this, their label backed out from all promotion plans.  Taraxias joined the Hellenic Air Force in 2002 for his mandatory service. This led to the group breaking up.

Family The Label 
Taraxias returned under the Hip Hop label, Family, in 2004. After opening for Cypress Hill, Taraxias started working on his first solo album. It was released in 2005, and Diatarahi was the first single off the album. Taraxias was also featured in the Golden Edition of La Sagrada Familia, Goin' Through's gold selling album, in the track " - Evro". He also appeared in numerous tracks in the group's new project, titled Vendetta.

After being the opening act for Busta Rhymes, Taraxias toured Greece alongside Goin' Through, TNS, Isorropistis, Thirio, Breakers Without Fear, DJ The Boy and Sifu VERSUS. After the album Veto, he left the Family Label and made his own Label called Hip Hop movement.

References

Living people
Year of birth missing (living people)
Greek rappers
Greek hip hop musicians